Irish pop rock band The Script has released six studio albums, four EPs, 22 singles and 20 music videos.

The Script released their debut self-titled studio album, The Script, in 2008. The album went to number one in both Ireland and the United Kingdom. It also reached the top ten in Australia and Sweden, and peaked at number 19 on the US Top Heatseekers chart.

The Script's debut single, "We Cry", peaked in the top 10 of the Irish and Danish charts. It was followed by their most successful single from their first album, "The Man Who Can't Be Moved", which reached number two on the Irish, Danish and the UK Singles Charts. "Breakeven" was then released; peaking at number three in Australia and number 10 in Ireland.

Albums

Studio albums

Compilation albums

Extended plays

Singles

Other charted songs

Music videos

Covers
 "Lose Yourself" by Eminem in the Live Lounge (live)
 "Times Like These" by Foo Fighters
 "Written in the Stars" by Tinie Tempah at the Aviva Stadium (live)
 "Anything Could Happen" by Ellie Goulding in the Live Lounge
 "Stay" by Rihanna from the Radio 1 Academy in Derry (live)
 "Babylon" by David Gray
 "Heroes" by David Bowie in Like A Virgin radio (live)
 "Part-Time Lover" by Stevie Wonder with Kelly Rowland
 "Chandelier" by Sia
 "Drive" by The Cars
 " Dancing in the Dark" by Bruce Springsteen (live at UNTOLD 2021)

Notes

References

Discographies of Irish artists
Rock music group discographies
Discography